William Mason (22 October 1757 – 7 February 1818) was an American planter and soldier. He was a militiaman in the American Revolutionary War and a prominent Virginia planter. Mason was the third son of George Mason, an American patriot, statesman, and delegate from Virginia to the U.S. Constitutional Convention.

Early life and education
Mason was born on 22 October 1757. He was the fourth child and third eldest son of George Mason and his wife Ann Eilbeck. Like his brothers, Mason was educated by tutors at Gunston Hall.

American Revolutionary War
During the American Revolutionary War, Mason accepted a captain's commission and served in the Fairfax Militia fighting under Henry Lee III in South Carolina. In 1780, Mason's father declined an offer by Lee to continue his military service because his father felt Mason's "lot must be that of a farmer and gentleman." Mason was presented with a sword by General George Washington, which was said to have been given to him by Charles III of Spain. Mason returned to private life between December 1780 and June 1781.

Properties
In 1780, Mason inherited the Eilbeck family estates, Araby and Mattawoman, in Charles County, Maryland, from his maternal grandfather upon the death of his widow (Mason's grandmother), Sarah Eilbeck. 
Mason also received all his father's properties in Charles County. These properties were located along Chicamuxen and Mattawoman Creeks, adjacent to the Eilback lands.

Marriage and children
Unlike his eldest two brothers (but like his two younger brothers), Mason did not marry during his father's lifetime, but rather within a year after his death. On July 11, 1793 William Mason married Ann Stuart, daughter of Rev. William and Sarah Stuart, on 11 July 1793 at St. Paul's Episcopal Church in King George, Virginia. The bride's grandfather as well as her father served as rector of St. Paul's parish in King George County, and Sarah became the heiress of her maternal grandfather, Richard Foote of Cedar Grove plantation in King George County. The couple had five children, of whom four married. Their second son, another George Mason, would purchase Lexington from his uncle's estate and in turn left it to his son George Mason of Springbank, who died of typhoid fever and without children in Portland, Oregon on April 19, 1888.

William Stuart Mason (1795–7 March 1857)
George Mason of Hollin Hall (11 November 1797–25 March 1870)
Ann Sarah Stuart Mason Heileman (1803–9 November 1852)
Edgar Eilbeck Mason (1807–8 January 1835)
Mary Elizabeth Mason (1810–2 February 1885)

Death and legacy
Mason died on 7 February 1818 at Mattawoman in Charles County, Maryland at age 60. Although that plantation house no longer exists, Araby does. His descendants occupied Araby until 1849.  Mason's daughter Mary Elizabeth Mason sold the  including the mansion to William Thompson in that year.

Relations
William Mason (1757–1814) was:
a son of George Mason (1725–1792)
nephew of Thomson Mason (1733–1785)
first cousin of Stevens Thomson Mason (1760–1803), John Thomson Mason (1765–1824), and William Temple Thomson Mason (1782–1862)
uncle of George Mason VI (1786–1834) and Richard Barnes Mason (1797–1850), Thomson Francis Mason (1785–1838), and James Murray Mason (1798–1871)
first cousin once removed of Armistead Thomson Mason (1787–1819), John Thomson Mason (1787–1850), and John Thomson Mason, Jr. (1815–1873), and
first cousin twice removed of Stevens Thomson Mason (1811–1843).

References

1757 births
1818 deaths
18th-century American Episcopalians
19th-century American Episcopalians
American people of English descent
American planters
American slave owners
British North American Anglicans
Businesspeople from Maryland
Businesspeople from Virginia
George Mason
Mason family
People from Charles County, Maryland
People from Fairfax County, Virginia
Virginia militiamen in the American Revolution